Kurt Heintel (1924–2002) was an Austrian film and television actor.

Selected filmography
 Vagabonds (1949)
 A Devil of a Woman (1951)
 The Monastery's Hunter (1953)
 The Poacher (1953)
 The Last Reserves (1953)
 The Red Prince (1954)
 As Long as You Live (1955)
 The Song of Kaprun (1955)
 The Story of Anastasia (1956)
 War of the Maidens (1957)
 Jedermann (1961)
 Help, My Bride Steals (1964)
 Duel at Sundown (1965)

References

Bibliography

External links 
 

1924 births
2002 deaths
Austrian male film actors
Austrian male television actors
Male actors from Vienna